Jayam is a 2003 Indian Tamil-language romantic action film directed by M. Raja in his Tamil debut. The film is a remake of the 2002 Telugu-language film with the same title. It featured Ravi and Sadha in their first Tamil ventures respectively, with the success of the film prompting the actor to retain the film's title as a prefix to his stage name. It also stars Gopichand, who is reprising his role in the Telugu movie, alongside an ensemble supporting cast including, Rajeev, Pragathi, Nizhalgal Ravi, Nalini, Senthil, Suman Setty, and Ramesh Khanna. Till date, Jayam is the first and the only Tamil film Gopichand has performed in.

Plot
In Pushpathoor, the parents of first cousins Sujatha and Raghu decide that the children will marry one another when they grow up. Raghu is seen to be arrogant and negatively shaded since he was young. He smokes and steals money from his father. Once when Raghu attacks Sujatha's classmate when he helps her, Sujatha breaks all bonds with Raghu. When Raghu's family moves to another village, Sujatha and Raghu do not even say goodbye to each other. Meanwhile, Raghu's father gifts Sujatha with silver anklets and requests her to never remove them, to which she obliges. Several years pass by. Raghu and Sujatha are fairly distanced. Sujatha grows up to be a beautiful teenage girl, whereas Raghu becomes a rogue and womanizer. Every time his mother speaks of Sujatha, he feels disgusted. He even goes to the extent of sleeping with his servant.

Meanwhile, Sujatha goes to college, where she meets Ravi. Ravi is from an extremely poor family and does small jobs to survive his only mother and pay money to the moneylender. He has a decent group of friends, and they are classmates with Sujatha. Ravi has an instant crush on Sujatha, while Sujatha does not reciprocate. Ravi asks Sujatha to come to the temple festival, to which she denies, but in the end, Sujatha comes, indicating that she is in love with Ravi. Ravi and Sujatha start dating and communicate with each other on the train by writing to each other on the blackboard at the side of the train.

Once, when building up the courage to board the same compartment on the train as Ravi, Sujatha is spotted by the family astrologer. She goes home scared, and as she had expected, the astrologer told Sujatha's father. Her father tells her that she would be married to Raghu, just as they decided years ago. Sujatha protests, but her father stays firm. This results in Sujatha dropping out of college and staying at home. Sujatha has a sister named Kalyani, who turns out to be the messenger between her and Ravi.

Raghu comes for the engagement reluctantly (still thinking about their childhood encounter) but instantly falls for her the moment he sees her. He warns Sujatha that she would never go away and marry him in the end. They both are engaged. The whole family goes to the family temple after the engagement, and there, Sujatha sees Ravi waiting for her. She is spotted talking to Ravi by Raghu and his gang, and they mercilessly beat him up. Traumatized, Sujatha runs to her father, but Raghu indirectly warns her family that things would turn out wrong if Ravi is seen anywhere near Sujatha.

Ravi gets treated, and Sujatha's marriage is nearing. As a last hope, Sujatha asks her sister to inform Ravi without letting any of Raghu's men know. Her sister goes to the railway station and waits for Ravi. When he comes, fearing that someone would see her, she writes the details on the blackboard. She eyes him to read it and leaves in a haste and is shown that Raghu's men are actually with her. Ravi comes and reads the board. However, Sujatha's sister has a habit of writing the letters "it" and "la" in between words, making it difficult for the readers to read them. Ravi ignores the message and leaves.

Fearing that Ravi would come and take Sujatha away, Raghu sends his men to Ravi's house. They trash the whole house and the things inside, sparing his mother. His mother tells Ravi's friends that he should come back with Sujatha, and if he does not, she would kill him. Ravi, who somehow cracked the code that Sujatha's sister wrote, realizes that Sujatha's wedding is the next day. He then mysteriously comes into Raghu's home and writes that he would be the one marrying Sujatha in the end, in blood, triggering Raghu. The same thing happens in Sujatha's home on their wedding day.  Raghu, in a rush, asks the family to hurry and complete the wedding. Sujatha goes into the room to change, but in reality, she is waiting for Ravi, after seeing his message on the wall. Raghu comes and breaks open the door, and at the same time, Ravi comes through the roof and rescues Sujatha.

Angered and defeated, Raghu goes after the couple, and a chase ensues, which results in Ravi getting wounded by Raghu. The couple and Ravi's friend helped them escape on the train with the help of the conductor, but Raghu enters the train with his men. The couple escapes to the roof, where they are cornered. To save themselves, they jump off the train and roll down to a forest. To their shock, Raghu and his men come there as well. Raghu once more corners them and asks Ravi to fight him, face-to-face. In the end, Ravi wins, bringing out his confidence, and also wins Sujatha's hand.

Cast

Soundtrack
Songs and background score is handled by R.P. Patnaik making his debut in Tamil. For the tamil remake, Patnaik replaced "Raanu Raanu" with the remake of "Gaajuvaka Pilla" from Nuvvu Nenu because the song Raanu was remade as "Kai Kai Vekran" for Bhagavathi.
 "Kanamoochi" - Shankar Mahadevan
 "Kavithayae Theriyuma" - Harini, Manicka Vinayagam, R.P. Patnaik
 "Thiruvizhannu Vantha" - Tippu, Gowri, Raja, Ravi
 "Vandi Vandi Railu Vandi" - Tippu, Manicka Vinayagam
 "Kaathal Kaathal" - Karthik
 "Kaathal Thandha Vali" - Karthik, Ganga Sitharasu
 "Kodi Kodi Minnalgal" - Vijay Yesudas

Release
Jayam opened to mixed reviews, with a critic from The Hindu stating the film gave a sense of "déjà vu" but added that Raja's "treatment is interesting in patches". The film went on to become a surprise success at the box office, and prompted both Raja and Ravi to adopt "Jayam" to their stage names as a prefix, while their home production studio was renamed Jayam Company.The film collected 25 crores at the box office and became commercially successful.

References

External links
 

Indian action drama films
2003 films
Tamil remakes of Telugu films
Films directed by Mohan Raja
2000s Tamil-language films
Films shot in Kollam
Films set on trains
Films scored by R. P. Patnaik
Indian romantic action films
Indian romantic drama films
2000s masala films
2000s action drama films
2000s romantic action films
2003 romantic drama films